Adopt Me (stylised as ADOPT ME!) is a massively multiplayer online game developed by Uplift Games on the gaming and game development platform Roblox. The original focus of the game was a role-play wherein players pretended to be either a parent adopting a child, or a child getting adopted, but as the game was developed further, its focus shifted to being about adopting and caring for a variety of different virtual pets, which can be traded with other players. Uplift Games, the independent studio behind the game, employs roughly 40 people and earns 60 million dollars a year, mostly from microtransactions. The game was averaging 160,000 concurrent players as of September 2022, making it one of the most popular and successful games on Roblox. As of November 2022, Adopt Me! has reached 30.8 billion visits, 25 million + favourites and is still one of the highest games with current users, their record being with the dress your pets update, giving them 1.6M+ concurrent players.

Gameplay

Adopt Me! revolves around adopting and caring for a variety of different types of pets, which hatch from eggs. Some pets can only be purchased with Robloxs virtual currency, Robux. Pets are grouped into 5 classes, based on rarity and cost. These groups are common, uncommon, rare, ultra-rare, and legendary. Once hatched, pets grow from their starting status as newborns, growing up into juniors, pre-teens, teens, post-teens, and eventually becoming full-grown. If a player has four fully grown pets of the same type, they can combine them to form a "Neon" pet, and four fully grown neon pets can be combined into a "Mega-Neon" pet. Purchases within the game are facilitated both by Robux, and through Adopt Me!s virtual currency, simply called "Bucks". Bucks can be earned by fulfilling the needs of a pet, such as eating and drinking, among other methods. Players can also adopt children and roleplay with other users.

History
Prior to 2018, Adopt Me! had been solely about adopting children, in line with several previous Roblox games with the same concept. Originally, the game was a collaboration between two Roblox users who go by the usernames "Bethink" and "NewFissy". The game added the feature of adoptable pets in summer of 2019, which caused the game to rapidly increase in popularity. Adopt Me! had been played slightly over three billion times by December 2019. On April Fools in 2020, Adopt Me! received an update that included a pet rock, available for a limited time. This update caused the game to achieve 680,000 concurrent players, which received attention as it was three times as much as the Steam game with the most concurrent players at that time, Mount & Blade II: Bannerlord. In July 2020, the game had been played upwards of ten billion times. By March 2021, Adopt Me! had around 20 billion total visits.

Promotional events
On May 4, 2020, Uplift Games and DreamCraft partnered with Warner Bros. Pictures and Warner Animation Group to promote the CGI-animated film Scoob!. As part of the event, Scooby-Doo (as a puppy) was brought into the game as a temporary pet where players could drive around in the Mystery Machine (also limited-time) and complete a task where they could help find his missing collar in-exchange for three detective-themed pet accessories. The pet, vehicle and collar were later removed from the game after the event concluded.

One year later on November 18, 2021, they partnered with Universal Pictures and Illumination to promote the CGI-animated film Sing 2. For the event, players could talk to Buster Moon next to a stage to complete a task of finding different pieces across the map in-exchange for a Galaxy Explorer pet accessory helmet. The Buster Moon NPC, stage and pieces were later removed from the game after the event concluded.

On June 16, 2022, they partnered with Universal Pictures and Illumination Entertainment to promote the CGI-animated film Minions: The Rise of Gru. The event allowed players to talk to Gru to adopt a Zodiac Minion Egg. To hatch the egg, players can complete various tasks eventually leading the egg hatching into a Zodiac Minion Chick.

Players
The highest number of concurrent players Adopt Me! has achieved is 1.92 million. Around a third of Roblox players on the Xbox One play Adopt Me!. Due to the presence of microtransactions in the game and the target demographic being young children, there have been instances of children spending large amounts of money on Adopt Me!, including one particular incident where a child from Australia spent $8,000 AUD (US$6,348.88) on the game.

Whenever there is a major update to the game, the number of players playing can triple, which can cause platform-wide disruption on Roblox.

Reception
Adopt Me! has received generally positive reviews from critics. PCGamesN, in an overview of what they considered the best games on Roblox, described it as "cute", and compared it positively to the Petz series, while ScreenRant described it as one of the best role-playing games in Roblox.

The game was nominated for "Favorite Video Game" at the 2023 Kids' Choice Awards.

Scams 
As on 2021, the game became notorious for its rise of scammers who scam the virtual pets.  Due to the high cost of pets within the game, with some rare pets selling for up to US$300 on off-platform sites, a large subculture of scammers have risen within Adopt Me!. As the primary user base of Adopt Me! is on average younger than the rest of Roblox, they are especially susceptible to falling for scams.

One of the most common ways in which scammers carry out their operation is through "trust trades", in which the scammer manipulates the player to trust them into trading a rare virtual item, promising to give the item back. If the scammer receives an item of value, they will either leave the game with the victim's virtual item, leaving the victim with no way to get it back, or block the victim and continue scamming other users.

On November 5, 2020, Adopt Me! released several new features focused on combating scams, including the introduction of "trade licenses" that are required to be earned before one can trade pets above rare rarity, the amount of pets you can trade, and the addition of viewable trade history and the addition of notifications to the player if the game detects a markedly unfair trade.

On July 2, 2020, BBC Newsround released a guide on how to not get scammed on Adopt Me!.

References

External links
 The game's page on the Roblox website
 Team Adopt Me's official website

2017 video games
Android (operating system) games
Xbox One games
Internet properties established in 2017
Online games
Massively multiplayer online role-playing games
Windows games
Indie video games
Social simulation video games
Virtual pet video games
Social casual games
Free-to-play video games
MacOS games
IOS games
Roblox